This is a list of people who have served as Lord-Lieutenant of Armagh. 

There were lieutenants of counties in Ireland until the reign of James II, when they were renamed governors. The office of Lord Lieutenant was recreated on 23 August 1831.

Lord Lieutenants

Governors

 Archibald Acheson, 2nd Earl of Gosford 1805–1831

Lord Lieutenants

Deputy lieutenants
A deputy lieutenant of Armagh is commissioned by the Lord Lieutenant of Armagh. Deputy lieutenants support the work of the lord-lieutenant. There can be several deputy lieutenants at any time, depending on the population of the county. Their appointment does not terminate with the changing of the lord-lieutenant, but they usually retire at age 75.

21st Century
14 June 2010: Jill Armstrong
5 July 2016: Simon Thomas Alexander Dougan
11 November 2018: Simon Cassells,

References

See also
County Armagh
List of lord lieutenants in the United Kingdom

 
County Armagh
Ulster
Armagh